Contri is an Italian surname. Notable people with the surname include:

Antonio Contri (before 1701–1731), Italian Baroque painter
Fernanda Contri (born 1935), Italian jurist and politician
Gianfranco Contri (born 1970), Italian cyclist

Italian-language surnames